Flora MacDonald was an 18th-century member of Clan Macdonald of Sleat. 

Flora MacDonald may also refer to:

 Flora MacDonald (politician), Canadian politician and humanitarian
 Flora MacDonald Denison, Canadian activist, journalist and businesswoman
 Flora Macdonald Mayor, English novelist and short story writer
 Flora Macdonald Reid, British, Scottish painter
 Flora MacDonald College, women's college in Red Springs, North Carolina, United States of America